"Superblaster" is the second single from the album Cuckoo by alternative rock band Curve. It was released on 8 November 1993. It's considered by fans as the rarest Curve release.

Track listing
"Superblaster" – 3:58
"Low and Behold" – 4:18
"Nothing Without Me" – 3:13

Music video
The video for "Superblaster" features the official and touring members of the band performing this song in colourful room, full of confetti.

Credits
 Written by Toni Halliday and Dean Garcia
 #1 produced by Curve & Flood and mixed by Alan Moulder
 #2 & #3 produced by Curve and mixed by Alan Moulder
 Sleeve design by Flat Earth
 Photography by Flat Earth and Vaughan Matthews

References

1993 singles
Curve (band) songs
1993 songs
Song recordings produced by Flood (producer)
Songs written by Dean Garcia
Songs written by Toni Halliday